The Greenback Era: A Social and Political History of American Finance, 1865-1879 is a book by American historian Irwin Unger, published in 1964 by Princeton University Press, which won the 1965 Pulitzer Prize for History.  It is about American finance in the post-Civil War period and the social and political elements involved.

References 

1964 non-fiction books
Pulitzer Prize for History-winning works
American history books
American political books
Princeton University Press books